Storth is a village near Arnside in Cumbria, England, situated near the border with Lancashire. It is in the historic county of Westmorland. The village faces the estuary of the River Kent.  Although the village is ancient the vast bulk of the homes are from the latter part of the 20th century.  There is a village church (Methodist and Anglican, in the Methodist building), and a primary school.  The only commercial enterprise in the village is the post office and shop, a locally owned co-operative.  Nearby Sandside has some commercial premises and a public house, The Ship Inn.

Storth is in the civil parish of Beetham in the South Lakeland local government district.

The name Storth is an old Norse name for a woody place.

See also

 Carr Bank

References

External links

 Storth Web Page
 Cumbria County History Trust: Beetham (nb: provisional research only – see Talk page)

Villages in Cumbria
Beetham